This is a timeline of the Tangut people and Western Xia.

7th century

620s

630s

680s

690s

8th century

720s

730s

9th century

870s

880s

890s

10th century

900s

910s

930s

940s

950s

960s

970s

980s

990s

11th century

1000s

1010s

1020s

1030s

1040s

1050s

1060s

1070s

1080s

1090s

12th century

1100s

1110s

1120s

1130s

1140s

1170s

1190s

13th century

1200s

1210s

1220s

15th century

1430s

16th century

1500s

References

Bibliography

 .

 (alk. paper) 
 

 

  (paperback).
 

 
 .

 

 
 

 
 

 

 
  
 

 
 

Tanguts
Tanguts
Tangut history
Western Xia